Andaigweos, also written as Ou-daig-weos and other variants of Ojibwa:  Aandegwiiyaas (Crow's Meat), was an Ojibwe leader who lived in the Zhaagawaamikong (Chequamegon) region in present-day Wisconsin on Lake Superior during the 18th century.  Andaigweos was member of the Loon doodem.  He was born on Madeline Island in the early 18th century.  His father was from Canada (likely Sault Ste. Marie area) and moved to the western end of Lake Superior during the Ojibwe migrations of the 18th century.  In his youth, the hereditary chiefs at Zhaagawaamikong were members of the Crane doodem.  He was the grandfather of Chief Buffalo.

Year of death missing
Native American leaders
Ojibwe people
Year of birth unknown
18th-century Native Americans
Native American people from Wisconsin
People from Ashland County, Wisconsin